The A-bike is a folding bicycle released by Sir Clive Sinclair in the United Kingdom on 12 July 2006. It was designed by Hong Kong design agency Daka, in collaboration with Sinclair Research, over a 5-year period. It was announced to the public in 2004. Clive Sinclair envisioned the A-bike, and Alex Kalogroulis was the main designer. In 2015, an electric version, the A-Bike Electric, was introduced to the public as part of a Kickstarter campaign.

A-Bike

History
The A-bike was designed by Sinclair Research, in collaboration with Hong Kong design agency Daka, over a 5-year period. It was announced to the public in 2004. Clive Sinclair envisioned the A-bike, and Alex Kalogroulis was the main design engineer. It was released on 12 July 2006, and was priced at £199. The official Europe distributor, Mayhem UK, hoped to sell 25,000 units in the first 12 months. By 2007 it was being noted that a "large number of counterfeit" A-bikes were appearing in China and elsewhere.

Early reviews praised the A-bike for being lightweight and easy to fold, but noted the flexing frame and uncomfortable saddle, and criticised the tiny wheels for being unsafe on uneven roads.

In 2008 the Mark-II version was released: officially known as the A-Bike Plus. This version had strengthened aluminium tubing, a new air-sprung cushioned saddle, and an upgraded drive mechanism. The Mark-III version was released in 2010, and was officially known as the A-Bike City. The main changes were larger  wheels and it was priced at £299.99.

Characteristics 
The original model weighs , and folds to  reducing its volume to about 25% of its original size. The crankcase housing almost completely encloses the drive mechanism, protecting it and preventing oil stains on clothing or floor surfaces.

Media appearances 
In November 2006, A-bike was featured on UK television programme The Gadget Show, alongside the Strida.  The distribution company behind the A-bike was featured on the UK Television programme Badger or Bust broadcast on 5 June 2007. In the Top Gear epic race Car vs. Train 2. Richard Hammond and James May carried A-bikes in their suitcases and unfolded them to bike from a ferry dock to a cable car.

A-Bike Electric
In 2015, an electric version, the A-Bike Electric, was introduced to the public as part of a Kickstarter campaign. The design featured 8-inch wheels, as well as a larger seat and sturdier frame. The funding campaign was successful and production began before the end of the year.

See also
 Sinclair Zike - Sinclair's earlier attempt at a portable electric bicycle
 Brompton Bicycle - another British-designed small-wheeled bicycle
 Mini125 - a similar Italian-designed small-wheeled bicycle

References

External links 

 
 
 

Folding bicycles
Cycle manufacturers of the United Kingdom
Sinclair Research